Wilhelm Schmidt may refer to:

Wilhelm Schmidt (historian) (1817–1901), Austrian-Moravian historian who has written on Romanian culture
Wilhelm Schmidt (engineer) (1858–1924), German engineer and inventor, nicknamed Hot Steam Schmidt due to his work with superheated steam
Wilhelm Schmidt (linguist) (1868–1954), Austrian linguist and anthropologist
Wilhelm Adolf Schmidt (1812–1887), German historian
 (1883–1936), Austrian climatologist

See also
William Schmidt (disambiguation)
William Smith (disambiguation)